Aagneyam is a 1993 Malayalam-language film directed by P. G. Viswambharan and written by John Zakaria and Kaloor Dennis, starring Jayaram, Nedumudi Venu, Sunitha, Gautami, Maathu, Sankaradi, Thilakan and Mala Aravindan in the lead roles.

Plot
Madhavaan Kutty, an Ayurvedic doctor, is sentenced to capital punishment for twin murders. Mathew Stephan, the jail superintendent, trusts that Madhavan Kutty is innocent. His appeal at Supreme Court is still at pending, when upon hearing that his sister has attempted to commit suicide, and his mother has fallen ill, Madhavan Kutty decides to escape. He misuses his freedom at the residence of Mathew Stephan to escape in disguise of police uniform. Alarmed at the jail break, the police search for him. Madhavan Kutty reaches a forest area where he is attacked by Velayudhan Ashan, who mistakes him for an animal. Upon seeing him wounded, Velayudhan Asan takes him to his residence. Madhavan Kutty decides to stay there for the time being. In the meantime, Nandakumar, the police inspector is assigned the charge of capturing Madhavan Kutty. He is shocked to see Shobha Menon, his once girlfriend to be the wife of Nandakumar. Velu Asan upon realizing who Madhavan Kutty is, decides to save him. His ailing mother dies before Madhavan Kutty could meet her. In rage he decides to attend the funeral of his mother to perform the last rites. Once the function is over, he surrenders to Nandakumar.  But Velu Asan confesses to the authorities that Madhavan Kutty is innocent and in reality the two murders were committed by him in revenge for the death of his daughter. Madhavan Kutty is thus released free to join his family.

Cast

Jayaram as Dr.Madhavan Kutty/Raghavan
Nedumudi Venu as Mathew Stephan
Thilakan as Velayudhan Aashan
Sunitha as Ramani
Gautami as Shobha Nandakumar Menon
Maathu as Emi Mathew Stephan
Siddique as C.I Nandakumar
Vijayaraghavan as Mammali
Mala Aravindan as Sukumaran Pillai
Innocent as Pappachan
Sukumari as Bhageerathi
Sankaradi as Ammavan
Mamukkoya as Mukkathu Moosa
Indrans as Rajappan
Shivaji as Krishnadas
Jose Pellissery as Rappayi
Jagannatha Varma as IG
Beena Antony as Sunitha
Santhakmari as Mammali's mother

Soundtrack
"Manjumanjeera (female)" - KS Chithra
"Manjumanjeera (male)" - KJ Yesudas
"Nataraajamandapam" - KJ Yesudas

References

External links

1993 films
1990s thriller drama films
Indian thriller drama films
Films scored by Johnson
Films directed by P. G. Viswambharan
1990s Malayalam-language films